Zoltán Balog (born 7 January 1958) is a Hungarian Calvinist bishop and former politician, who served as Minister of Human Resources from 2012 to 2018. He is the bishop of the Dunamellék diocese of the Hungarian Reformed Church from January 25, 2021. On February 17, 2021, he was elected pastoral president by the Synod of the Hungarian Reformed Church.

Studies and pastoral activity
Zoltán Balog was born in Ózd on 7 January 1958. He was a volunteer in the post-WW2 renovation works of church buildings in Wittenberg, Goppeln and Dresden. He was an extramural student of Protestant theology at the Humboldt University in East Berlin in 1980. He finished his secondary studies at the Calvinist College of Debrecen in 1976. He worked as mechanical worker and turner for the Diósgyőr Machine Factory (DIGÉP) between 1976 and 1977. He was a caretaker at the Catholic Social Home of Hosszúhetény from 1979 to 1980. He started his theology studies at the Debrecen Reformed Theological University. He spent four semesters at the Martin Luther University of Halle-Wittenberg from 1981 to 1983. He graduated as a Calvinist pastor in the Budapest Reformed Theological Academy in 1983.

He served as a pastor in Maglód and five surrounding villages between 1983 and 1987. Thereafter, he spent two years as a postgraduate student in the University of Tübingen. He worked as a consultant for the Conference of European Churches (CEC). He was a pastor for East German refugees in Csillebérc pioneering camp in September 1989. He was a lecturer at the Budapest Reformed Theological University between 1989 and 1991. He taught divinity at the Deutsche Schule Budapest from 1991 to 1996 and the Baár–Madas Calvinist College from 1992 to 1993. He was a scientific associate for the Ecumenical  Institute of the University of Bonn between 1993 and 1996. He was elected pastor of the German-speaking Protestant Congregation in Budapest in 1996, holding the position until 2006. He is a curator of the fund of the Bethesda Children Hospital since 2000.

Political career
He was a member of the National Assembly (MP) from 2006 to 2018. He functioned as chairman of the Parliamentary Committee on Human Rights, Minority, Civic and Religious Affairs between 2006 and 2010.

Between 2 June 2010 and 13 May 2012, he was State Secretary for Social Inclusion within the Ministry of National Resources. On 3 May 2012 Minister of National Resources Miklós Réthelyi resigned from his office. Prime Minister Viktor Orbán appointed Balog as the successor to Réthelyi. The office was also renamed to Ministry of Human Resources. During his ministership, the Klebelsberg Institution Maintenance Centre (KLIK) was established on 1 September 2012, which became the central state agency for managing schools and marked centralised education system.

Months before the 2017 presidential election, in December 2016, the opposition ATV channel claimed that Balog had been selected by Orbán and the Fidesz party leadership as successor to János Áder as President of Hungary. Balog refused to comment on press reports. In contrast to ATV, Fidesz-backed Origo.hu reported three days later that Áder would remain as President despite such "serious candidates" as Balog and Barnabás Lenkovics, a former President of the Constitutional Court. The news portal added that re-election was a decision only for Áder, who had asked for time to consider his candidature. ATV also referred to the government's dilemma: was it appropriate to elect a Calvinist President (Balog), with the incumbent Prime Minister (Viktor Orbán) and House Speaker (László Kövér) also belonging to that ecclesiastical community, despite Hungary's Catholic majority? Index.hu journalist Szabolcs Dull quoted views and opinions from the ruling party, which told, in addition to Balog's Calvinist religion, which indeed appeared to be a strong argument against his nomination in the eyes of the Prime Minister, who sought good relations with the Catholic Church in Hungary; removing Balog from his current position as Minister of Human Resources would have caused major problems in the ministry and the entire government structure, in contrast to an expected political benefit if Fidesz elected Balog president. Dull argued that Áder had in the event not caused "big trouble" during his first term, and so his re-election "did not represent a significant political risk" to Orbán. On 5 January 2017, left-wing liberal portal 444.hu reported that several members of the Fidesz presidency, primarily László Kövér and Gergely Gulyás, had succeeded in convincing Orbán at the Dobogókő meeting to choose Áder rather than Balog.

On 23 April 2018, Balog announced, he will step down as Minister of Human Resources, disagreeing with the prime minister over structural considerations, who intended to keep the type of superministry system. Balog was appointed managing director of the Fidesz's Foundation for Civic Hungary. Balog also resigned from his parliamentary seat on 12 September 2018, with the effect date of 17 October 2018. Retiring from daily politics, he continued his career as a Calvinist pastor. He was replaced by Gyula Budai.

In bishopric service 
On November 5, 2020, Zoltán Balog was elected bishop of the Dunamellék diocese of the Hungarian Reformed Church. At his inauguration on January 25, 2021, he officially took over the episcopal office from his predecessor, István Szabó, who led the diocese for 18 years. He called the strengthening of communities his most urgent task after his swearing-in. He distinguished the difference between his former ministerial service and the forthcoming episcopal service as follows:

The subsequent episcopal ordination took place on 24 May 2021 in Nagykőrös, Pest County.

He was elected pastoral president by the Synod of the Hungarian Reformed Church on February 17, 2021.

Personal life
Balog is married, has five children and 8 grandchildren. He divorced his first wife in 1989. His wife is Judit Révész, an assistant professor with whom they have lived since 1990. Of her five children, four are girls: Anna, Veronika, Eleonóra and Réka, and he has a son, Ádám.

References

1958 births
Living people
Fidesz politicians
Government ministers of Hungary
Hungarian Calvinist and Reformed clergy
Members of the National Assembly of Hungary (2006–2010)
Members of the National Assembly of Hungary (2010–2014)
Members of the National Assembly of Hungary (2014–2018)
Members of the National Assembly of Hungary (2018–2022)
People from Ózd
Grand Crosses with Star and Sash of the Order of Merit of the Federal Republic of Germany